Food Wars was a weekly Travel Channel series hosted by Camille Ford that debuted on Tuesday, March 9, 2010. The show featured restaurant rivalries in cities around the United States, with loyal fans cheering for one of two restaurants that serve one of the city's signature dishes. A blind taste test with five tasters was conducted at the end of each show to decide which restaurant's version of the dish was better.

The show aired 1 season from March to November 2010. It was cancelled and not picked for any further seasons.

Format

In each episode, Food Wars traveled to a particular U.S. city and finds two restaurants who are top-rated rivals serving the same dish, one symbolic of the featured city (e.g., Buffalo wings in Buffalo, New York). Ford visits both restaurants, tries the dish in question and talks with owners and fans. The show presents a history of each restaurant and origins of the rivalry.

At the end of each episode, a taste test was conducted with the judging panel.  Each judge tasted a sample of each dish and voted for his or her favorite. The restaurant that received more votes was declared the winner of that food war.  In the beginning of the series, the panel consisted of two "super fans" - one of each restaurant's most loyal customers and fans - and three impartial judges consisting of local personalities and/or critics.  Also, in this format, the judging was done via a blind taste test, where the identity of each sample was not revealed until after the judging.  Beginning with the 14th episode the taste test format changed. The superfans were dropped and host Ford joined the taste test panel with two other locals. The panel is no longer blindfolded; they know whose dish they are tasting and can ask the owner questions.

Episodes

Food Wars debuted on March 9, 2010 with two back-to-back episodes that premiered at 10:00 and 10:30 PM EST, featuring buffalo-wing restaurants in Buffalo, New York and Italian-beef restaurants in Chicago. Further episodes aired on Wednesday nights at 10:00 PM EST.

References

External links
 Official website

Travel Channel original programming
2010 American television series debuts
2010 American television series endings